Columbus Keith Short Jr. (born September 19, 1982) is an American actor and choreographer. He choreographed Britney Spears's Onyx Hotel Tour and worked with Brian Friedman (of So You Think You Can Dance fame). He is best known for his roles in the films Stomp the Yard, Cadillac Records, Armored, and The Losers. He previously starred as a series regular in the ABC drama Scandal, as Harrison Wright. On April 26, 2014, it was announced that Short would leave Scandal after three seasons with the show.

Early life and education
Short was born in Kansas City, Missouri to a family he has described as "musical". His mother, Janette, has a talent management company. He has two brothers, John Rancipher and Chris Staples. Short relocated to Los Angeles when he was five years old and immediately began working in a youth theater. He attended Marcos De Niza High School in Tempe, Arizona, as well as El Segundo High School and the Orange County School of the Arts, before leaving to join the off-Broadway tour of Stomp.

Career
Short's acting debut came as a dancer in You Got Served and he later appeared in Accepted, starring Justin Long. He then took lead roles in the direct-to-DVD movie Save the Last Dance 2 alongside Izabella Miko and Stomp the Yard. He has also appeared twice in the Disney Channel Original Series That's So Raven as Trey, a member of the fictional boy band "Boyz n' Motion." Other TV appearances include ER and Judging Amy.

In 2006, he appeared in NBC's Studio 60 on the Sunset Strip as novice show-writer Darius Hawthorne. He was among the presenters at the 2007 NAACP Image Awards. In 2007, Columbus appeared in the movie This Christmas also starring Chris Brown and Lauren London. In 2008, Short appeared in the movie Quarantine, co-starring Jay Hernandez and Jennifer Carpenter, and played the part of musician Little Walter in Cadillac Records, with Jeffrey Wright, Beyoncé Knowles, and Oscar-winner Adrien Brody. In 2010, he played "Pooch" in the film The Losers, based on the graphic novel, co-starring Jeffrey Dean Morgan, Chris Evans, and Zoe Saldana, and directed by Sylvain White (who had already directed Short in Stomp The Yard).

Personal life
Short was married to Brandi Short, but they split in 2003. They have a son.

He married dancer Tanee McCall in 2005. She filed for divorce twice once in September 2013 and again in April 2014. They have a daughter, Ayala.

In August 2016, Short announced his engagement to Aida Abramyan. The couple wed in December of that year and have two sons together.

Legal troubles
In 2014, as part of a no-jail plea agreement, Short pleaded guilty to misdemeanor domestic violence and performed 30 hours of community service.

Short also avoided jail by pleading no contest to a felony assault charge after throwing "a running punch" at his in-law during a family gathering at a bar. Short stated he was being taunted and acted in self-defense, and his opponent admitted he had removed his jersey and was prepared to fight Short before the punch caused a concussion and fractured eye socket.

In an interview with Access Hollywood Live, Short said that substance abuse, both alcoholism and cocaine use due to the stress of family issues and personal loss, led to his departure from Scandal.

Filmography

Film

Television

Awards and nominations
Black Reel Awards
2008, Best Ensemble: Cadillac Records (Winner)
2008, Best Breakthrough Performance: Cadillac Records (Nominated)
Image Awards
2009, Outstanding Supporting Actor in a Motion Picture: Cadillac Records (Winner)
2008, Outstanding Actor in a Motion Picture: Stomp the Yard (Nominated)
MTV Movie Awards
2007, Breakthrough Performance: Stomp the Yard (Nominated)
2007, Best Kiss: Stomp the Yard w/ Meagan Good (Nominated)
Teen Choice Awards
2007, Best Dance: Stomp the Yard (Nominated)

References

External links

Stomp the Yard interview
Cadillac Records Interview w/ Chris Brown/Rihanna mention

1982 births
Living people
21st-century American male actors
African-American choreographers
African-American male actors
African-American male dancers
American choreographers
American male dancers
American male film actors
American male musical theatre actors
American male television actors
Male actors from Kansas City, Missouri
Male actors from Los Angeles
Orange County School of the Arts alumni